The United States Parole Commission Extension Act of 2013 is a federal law that extended the existence of the United States Parole Commission an additional five years until November 2018. The law also requires the Commission to file a report with Congress on their activities. The United States Parole Commission is the parole board responsible to grant or deny parole and to supervise those released on parole to incarcerated individuals who come under its jurisdiction. It is part of the United States Department of Justice.

Provisions of the bill
The United States Parole Commission Extension Act of 2013 extends the existence of the United States Parole Commission for another 5 years. It does this by amending the Sentencing Reform Act of 1984 ( note; Public law 98-473). The law requires the Parole Commission to write a report for the United States House Committee on the Judiciary and the United States Senate Committee on the Judiciary about the parole commission and its activities. Seventeen different items are required in this report, including information about the number of record reviews done, the number of offenders the commission has jurisdiction over, the number of hearings held, and their expenditures.

Procedural history
The United States Parole Commission Extension Act of 2013 was introduced into the United States House of Representatives on September 26, 2013 by Rep. Steve Chabot (R, OH-1). It was referred to the United States House Committee on the Judiciary and the United States House Judiciary Subcommittee on Crime, Terrorism, Homeland Security and Investigations. On October 14, 2013, the House voted to pass the bill by unanimous consent. The United States Senate voted on October 30, 2013 to pass the bill by unanimous consent, and the bill was signed into law by President Barack Obama on October 31, 2013, extending the life of the U.S. Parole Commission until November 2018.

Debate and discussion
Senator Patrick Leahy argued in favor of the bill for reasons of public safety. According to Leahy, "the consequences of failing to reauthorize the Commission would be dire," because without the Commission to provide parole hearings, 3,500 inmates would be released.

See also
List of bills in the 113th United States Congress
United States Parole Commission

Notes/References

External links

Library of Congress - Thomas H.R. 3190
beta.congress.gov H.R. 3190
GovTrack.us H.R. 3190
OpenCongress.org H.R. 3190
WashingtonWatch.com H.R. 3190
U.S. Dept of Justice FY2013 Performance Budget for the U.S. Parole Commission

Acts of the 113th United States Congress
Parole